Red Tomahawk is a 1967 American Western film directed by R. G. Springsteen and written by Steve Fisher. The film stars Howard Keel, Joan Caulfield, Broderick Crawford, Scott Brady, Wendell Corey, Richard Arlen and Tom Drake. The film was released on January 1, 1967, by Paramount Pictures.

Plot

Army Captain Tom York is sent to contact General Custer at Little Big Horn, however by the time he arrives, all he finds is the massacred 7th Cavalry and the Sioux walking around. Tom York rides into the town of Deadwood in order to find a telegraph that he can use to warn the other regiments heading towards Custer's former location. The locals mistake York for a deserter until his friend Ep Wyatt vouches for him.

Somewhere in the area is hidden a pair of Gatling guns, which would be vital to fending off such an assault. The only person who knows the hiding place is Dakota Lil, a saloonkeeper who already has lost her husband and son in battle and wants no more part of it.

Ultimately persuaded by York to reveal where the guns are, they are betrayed by a gambler, Elkins, who intends to sell them to the enemy for a profit. York and others manage to get them back, and once everyone is town is safe, he decides to put down roots there with Dakota Lil.

Cast 
Howard Keel as Capt. Tom York
Joan Caulfield as Dakota Lil McCoy
Broderick Crawford as Columbus Smith
Scott Brady as Ep Wyatt
Wendell Corey as Sy Elkins
Richard Arlen as Deadwood Telegrapher
Tom Drake as Bill Kane
Tracy Olsen as Sal
Ben Cooper as Lt. Drake
Don "Red" Barry as Bly 
Regis Parton as Prospector #3 
Gerald Jann as Wu Sing
Roy Jenson as Prospector
Dan White as Ned Crone
Henry Wills as Samuels
Sol Gorss as Townsman / Roulette Player

See also
List of American films of 1967

References

External links 
 

1967 films
1960s English-language films
Paramount Pictures films
American Western (genre) films
1967 Western (genre) films
Films directed by R. G. Springsteen
Films scored by Jimmie Haskell
1960s American films